Pristobaeus namosi is a jumping spider species in the genus Pristobaeus. It was first identified in 1996 in Fiji. The species was initially placed in the genus Palpelius but was renamed Pristobaeus namosi when Palpelius was accepted as the junior synonym for Pristobaeus in 2015.

References

Spiders of Fiji
Salticidae
Spiders described in 1996